Abraham Elton is the name of:

Sir Abraham Elton, 1st Baronet (1654–1728), MP for Bristol
Sir Abraham Elton, 2nd Baronet (1679–1742), MP for Taunton and Bristol, of the Elton baronets
Sir Abraham Elton, 3rd Baronet (1703–1761), of the Elton baronets
Sir Abraham Isaac Elton, 4th Baronet (1717–1790), of the Elton baronets
Sir Abraham Elton, 5th Baronet (1755–1842), of the Elton baronets

See also
Charles Abraham Elton (1778–1853), English officer in the British Army and an author
Elton (disambiguation)